Dr. Federico M. Macaranas is a full-time professor at the Asian Institute of Management (AIM) and the Executive Director of the AIM Policy Center, a leading think tank in the Philippines and in South-East Asia. He was also conferred the Gawad Mabini, Dakilang Kamanong award, the highest award given by the Philippine government for diplomatic service, in 2001 by President Arroyo.

References

Year of birth missing (living people)
Filipino educators
Recipients of Gawad Mabini
Living people
Academic staff of the Asian Institute of Management